Alena Belyaeva (born February 13, 1992) is a Russian footballer who plays as a goalkeeper for BIIK Kazygurt at the Kazakhstani women's football championship.

Belyaeva was in the 23-players squad that represented Russia at the UEFA Women's Euro 2017, although she didn't play any of the team's matches in the competition.

References

External links
 
 
 

1992 births
Living people
Russia women's international footballers
Russian women's footballers
Women's association football goalkeepers
ZFK Zenit Saint Petersburg players
FC Chertanovo Moscow (women) players
Russian Women's Football Championship players
UEFA Women's Euro 2017 players